The  Campeonato Argentino de Rugby 1999  was based on the selection of the Argentine Rugby Union (Unione di Buenos Aires).

The 21 teams participating were divided into three levels : "Campeonato", "Ascenso", "Promocional".

Rugby Union in Argentina in 1999

National 
 The "Campeonato Argentino Menores de 21" (Under 21 championship) was won by Rosario
 The "Campeonato Argentino Menores de 19" (Under 19 championship) was won by Tucumán.
 The "National Championship for clubs" was won by La Tablada
 The first edition of Torneo del Interior (tournament with club outside Buenos Aires) was won by Jockey Club Córdoba
 The "Torneo de la URBA" (Buenos Aires) was won by San Isidro Club
 The "Cordoba Province Championship" was won by Tala
 The North-East Championship was won by Huirapuca

International 
 It was a great year for Argentina Rugby Union : at the 1999 Rugby World Cup, the "Pumas" obtained an historical qualification to quarter of final, beating in the play-off, the Ireland. In the quarter the Pumas were beaten by France.
 Previously in August, Argentina visited Scotland and Ireland for a four match tour, in order to prepare the World Cup. A victory against Scotland and a loss with Ireland, are the most important results.

 In June was Wales to visit Argentina for a five match tour, winning both the test with Pumas (36-26 and 23-16)

 In June France visit Argentina, and won both test with "Pumas" (35-18 and 37-12)
 In August, is Romania to visit Argentina, for a five match tour, The test is won by Pumas 68-22
 Argentina national team, in September visit Japan for a short tour (two matches). With an experimental team. lost the test match against Japan national team (29-44). In November, The Pumas visit Europe. Played six match, with three losses with Italy, France and Wales in the test match.

 In October, Argentina, won as usual the 1998 South American Rugby Championship
 In April there were the events for the "Centenary of Argentine Rugby". In 17 April, there was a match between the Pumas and an international selection called "Resto del Mundo" (Rest of the World). The "Pumas" won 49–21.

"Campeonato"
There were no relegation due to the return to an "eight teams formula" per 2000.

"Ascenso"

"Promocional"

Zone North 
 Pool 1 (withdraw of Samtiago)

  Pool 2

Zone Final

Zone South

Final 

Because of the restructuring of the championship, both teams were promoted.

External links 
 Memorias de la UAR 1999
  Francesco Volpe, Paolo Pacitti (Author), Rugby 2000, GTE Gruppo Editorale (1999)

Campeonato Argentino de Rugby
Argentina